Purugupta (Gupta script:  Pu-ra-gu-pta) (reigned 467–473 CE) was an emperor of the Gupta dynasty in northern India. Purugupta was a son of the Gupta emperor Kumaragupta I by his queen Anantadevi. He succeeded his half-brother Skandagupta. No inscription of Purugupta has been found so far. He is known from the Bhitari silver-copper seal of his grandson Kumaragupta III and Nalanda clay sealings of his sons Narasimhagupta and Budhagupta and his grandson Kumaragupta III. From the Saranath Buddha image inscription, it is concluded that he was succeeded by Kumaragupta II. According to Hornell and Dr Raychaudhary, Prakashaditya was another title of Purugupta, although this has now been disproven by Pankaj Tandon, who has definitively shown that Prakashaditya was the Hun king Toramana.

According to a Nalanda seal of Vishnugupta,  Vishnugupta was son of Kumaragupta (III), and grandson of Purugupta.

References

Sun temple at konark was built by Narishmadeva-1 in 13 century. The temple is now a world heritage site.

5th-century Indian monarchs
Gupta Empire